Neominois ridingsii, or Ridings' satyr, is a species of butterfly in the family Nymphalidae. It is found from southern Alberta, Saskatchewan and Manitoba south to the Guadalupe and Catron counties of New Mexico, and west to the central Sierra Nevada of California and central Oregon. The habitat consists of short-grass prairie, intermountain areas and grasslands with some areas of bare soil.

The wingspan is 38–56 mm. The upperside is gray with cream-colored patches across both wings. The forewing has two black spots. The underside is similar but lighter. Adults are on wing from June to July in one generation per year. Adults seldom feed, but if they do, they favor nectar of yellow composites.

The larvae feed on Bouteloua gracilis. Third- and fourth-instar larvae overwinter.

Subspecies
Neominois ridingsii ridingsii (Colorado)
Neominois ridingsii coloalbiterra Garhart & M. Fisher, 2008 (Colorado: Roan Cliffs)
Neominois ridingsii curicata M. Fisher, Scott & Garhart, 2008 (Colorado: upper Gunnison River Valley)
Neominois ridingsii minimus Austin, 1986 (southern Alberta east to south-western Manitoba, northern Montana and western North Dakota)
Neominois ridingsii neomexicanus Austin, 1986 (south-central Arizona, New Mexico)
Neominois ridingsii pallidus Austin, 1986 (Sierra Nevada in California and Nevada, from northern to central Oregon)
Neominois ridingsii stretchii (W.H. Edwards, 1870) (western Wyoming to western Colorado and from Washington to south-eastern Oregon Nevada and northern Arizona)
Neominois ridingsii wyomingo (Scott, 1998) (northern Colorado, Wyoming, Montana, Utah)

References

Butterflies described in 1865
Satyrini
Butterflies of North America
Taxa named by William Henry Edwards